Christopher Eugene O'Donnell (born June 26, 1970) is an American actor. He played Charlie Sims in Scent of a Woman, Chris Reece in School Ties, D'Artagnan in The Three Musketeers, Jack Foley in the drama film Circle of Friends, Dick Grayson/Robin in Batman Forever and Batman & Robin, Jason Brown in Robert Altman's Cookie's Fortune, Peter Garrett in Vertical Limit, and Wardell Pomeroy in Kinsey. O'Donnell stars as special Agent G. Callen on the CBS crime drama television series NCIS: Los Angeles, a spin-off of NCIS.

Early life
O'Donnell was born in the Chicago suburb of Winnetka, Illinois, the son of William Charles O'Donnell Sr., a general manager of WBBM-AM, and Julie Ann Rohs von Brecht. He is the youngest of seven children, with four sisters and two brothers, and is of German and Irish descent. O'Donnell was raised in a Catholic family and attended Catholic schools. He graduated from Loyola Academy in Wilmette, Illinois in 1988. O'Donnell then attended Boston College and graduated with a Bachelor of Science in marketing in 1992.

O'Donnell began modeling at the age of 13.

Career
O'Donnell started his career by appearing in numerous commercials as a teenager, including commercials for Cap'n Crunch cereal and Fruit Roll-Ups snacks, as well as a McDonald's fast food commercial in which he served NBA great Michael Jordan. An early television series role was an appearance on the TV series Jack and Mike in 1986. In the early 1990s, he appeared in several films including Men Don't Leave (1990), starring Jessica Lange; Fried Green Tomatoes (1991), reuniting him with Kathy Bates with whom he appeared with in Men Don't Leave; School Ties (1992); and Scent of a Woman (1992) with Al Pacino; O'Donnell would receive two nominations: one for a Golden Globe Award for Best Supporting Actor-Motion Picture (which was won by Gene Hackman for Unforgiven), and one for a Chicago Film Critics Association Award for Most Promising Actor (which he won). He was also named one of the 12 Promising New Actors of 1992 in John Willis's Screen World, Vol. 44.

After appearing in the film Blue Sky (1994), reuniting him with Jessica Lange from Men Don't Leave, he starred in Circle of Friends (1995) with Minnie Driver, Mad Love (1995) with Drew Barrymore, and In Love and War (1996) with Sandra Bullock. O'Donnell then went on to play the character of Dick Grayson/Robin in Batman Forever, in which Barrymore also made an appearance. He reportedly was part of a field of candidates for the role of Robin that included Leonardo DiCaprio, Matt Damon, Jude Law, Ewan McGregor, Corey Haim, Corey Feldman, Toby Stephens, and Scott Speedman. Casting directors narrowed their choices to O'Donnell and DiCaprio with O'Donnell eventually winning the role. O'Donnell was said to be one of the considerations of 20th Century Fox studios to play the lead role of Jack Dawson in Titanic (1997), but that role was ultimately won by DiCaprio.

O'Donnell followed with a starring role in 1996's The Chamber, based on the John Grisham novel. He subsequently reprised his role as Robin in 1997's Batman & Robin. Although it was a box-office success, the movie was critically panned and O'Donnell attested he believed it didn't turn out well.

O'Donnell did not appear in another movie for two years. He was one of the producers choice for the role of James Darrell Edwards III/Agent J in Men in Black (1997), but after turning it down because he thought the character would be too similar to his role in Batman Forever, the role went to Will Smith. The subsequent films Cookie's Fortune (1999) and The Bachelor (1999) were moderately successful, while Vertical Limit (2000) was a box office hit.

Following a four-year hiatus, O'Donnell returned in 2004 with the widely praised Kinsey. He also appeared in the 2004 episode of Two and a Half Men entitled "An Old Flame With A New Wick."
O'Donnell took a lead role in the Fox Network television series Head Cases in 2005. The show was the first of the fall 2005 season to be canceled, and only two episodes were aired. He was subsequently cast as veterinarian Finn Dandridge on the ABC medical drama Grey's Anatomy.

O'Donnell featured prominently in the TNT miniseries The Company as CIA case officer Jack McAuliffe, a character who progressed from spoonfed Yale elitist to jaded, post-Cold War cynic. In 2008 he appeared in Kit Kittredge: An American Girl as the titular character's father Jack Kittredge, and in Max Payne as Jason Colvin.

Since 2009, O'Donnell has starred in NCIS: Los Angeles, a spinoff of NCIS, as G. Callen, an NCIS Special Agent in charge of the Office of Special Projects Team stationed in Los Angeles. CBS describes Callen as "a chameleon who transforms himself into whomever he needs to be to infiltrate the criminal underworld."

In 2010, O'Donnell appeared in the sequel to the 2001 movie Cats & Dogs, The Revenge of Kitty Galore.

Personal life
O'Donnell married Caroline Fentress in April 1997 at St. Patrick in the City in Washington, D.C. They have five children.

O'Donnell is a practicing Catholic. 

According to Rolling Stone, O'Donnell is afraid of heights.

Filmography

Film

Television

References

External links

 
 
 
 Feature article on O'Donnell in June 2008 issue of Men's Vogue

1970 births
Male actors from Illinois
American male film actors
American people of German descent
American people of Irish descent
American male television actors
Boston College alumni
Living people
People from Winnetka, Illinois
20th-century American male actors
21st-century American male actors
People from Northfield, Illinois
People from Pacific Palisades, California
People from Islesboro, Maine
Catholics from Illinois
Catholics from Maine